Merriam Peak can refer to the following mountains in the United States:

Merriam Peak (California), in Fresno County
Merriam Peak (Idaho), in Custer County
Merriam Peak (Nevada), in Nye County

See also
Mount Merriam, Alaska

References